Špela Kratochwill (born 27 January 1998) is a Slovenian rhythmic gymnast.

She is the three-time (2014, 2015, 2016) Slovenian National All-Around champion and three-time Slovenian Junior National All-Around champion. She competed at 2015 European Championships where she placed 33rd with Hoop (15.500), 44th with Ball (14.966), 34th with Clubs (15.600) and 36th with Ribbon (14.983). Together with teammembers (Sara Kragulj and Monija Čebašek she placed 19th in Team competition. She competed at 2015 World Championships where she ended on 50th place All-Around, 48th with Hoop (15.566), 47th with Ball (15.350), 50th with Clubs (15.850) and 100th with Ribbon (13.616).

She competed at the 2016 Rio Olympics Test Event after 7 months recovering from injury and finished 24th in All-Around qualifications. At the 2016 World Cup Minsk she ended on 22nd place All-Around with score of 62.750. She did a great comeback at next competition, World Cup in Berlin, where she scored 21st in All-Around and get her highest score of 16.450 for Ball routine.

Routine music information

External links
 http://database.fig-gymnastics.com/public/gymnasts/biography/25989/false?backUrl=
 http://www.klubrg-narodnidom.si/sl/klub/tekmovalke/clanice/166-pela-kratochwill.html
 http://www.klubrg-narodnidom.si/sl/novice/1549-pela-kratochwill-brez-olimpijskega-nastopa.html

1998 births
Living people
Slovenian rhythmic gymnasts
Sportspeople from Ljubljana